Isoconazole is an azole antifungal drug and could inhibit gram positive bacteria. For foot and vaginal infections, isoconazole has a similar effectiveness to clotrimazole. Isoconazole nitrate may be used in combination with corticosteroid diflucortolone to increase its bioavailability.

It was patented in 1968 and approved for medical use in 1979.

References

21-Hydroxylase inhibitors
Aromatase inhibitors
Chloroarenes
CYP17A1 inhibitors
Phenylethanolamine ethers
Imidazole antifungals
Lanosterol 14α-demethylase inhibitors